Red Star Bangui FC is a Central African association football club that currently plays in the Central African Republic League. It is from the capital city of Bangui.

History
For the 2017/18 season, Red Star played in the Deuxième Division, the second-tier league in the county. By the 2018/19 season it was playing the top division.

References

Bangui
Football clubs in the Central African Republic
Association football clubs established in 1975
1975 establishments in the Central African Republic